The Chinese Character Simplification Scheme is the standardized simplification of Chinese characters promulgated in the 1950s by the State Council of the People's Republic of China. It contains the existing Simplified Chinese characters that are in use today. To distinguish from the later Second round of simplified Chinese characters, this reform is also known as the First Chinese Character Simplification Scheme.

History
In 1952, the Language Reform Research Committee of China first drafted the List of Frequently Used Simplification of Chinese Characters, affirming the principle of "only describing and stating the concepts of the ancient [Han] people, not creating [new characters]".

The Chinese Character Simplification Scheme (Draft) was published on 7 January 1955 for public consultation. It consists of three sections: List of simplification of 798 characters (draft), List of 400 variant characters intended to be abolished (draft) and List of simplification in handwriting of character components (draft). The second and third sections were deleted in the modification process. The modified Chinese Character Simplification Scheme (Draft) was passed by the National Language Reform Meeting after discussion in October 1955, followed by modifications by the Language Reform Committee of China in accordance to the outcome of the discussions. The modified draft was reviewed by the State Council's Committee for the Application of the Chinese Character Simplification Scheme.

On 21 November 1955, the Ministry of Education issued a Notice Regarding the Implementation of Simplified Chinese Character in All Schools. The People's Liberation Army General Political Department made similar notices in the same month.

On 28 January 1956, the 23rd State Council Plenary Meeting passed the Resolution Regarding the Promulgation of the "Chinese Character Simplification Scheme".

On 31 January 1956, the People's Daily published in full about the Resolution Regarding the Promulgation of the "Chinese Character Simplification Scheme" and the Chinese Character Simplification Scheme. The first list of the scheme was used nationwide on 1 February 1956, and the rest was put into use in batches later.

Later development

Significant changes were subsequently made to this scheme, in particular the introduction of the principle of simplification by analogy. In May 1964, the Language Reform Committee published the List of Simplified Chinese Characters to address the defects found in the Chinese Character Simplification Scheme.

It is divided into three parts. The first part records 352 simplified characters that are not used as radicals; The second part records simplified characters that may be used as radicals and 14 simplified radicals; The third part records 1,754 simplified characters that are formed according to its radicals. There are a total of 2,238 characters (realistically only 2,236 characters, as the characters 签 qiān and 须 xū appear twice as duplicates).

The Language Reform Committee of China proposed the Second Chinese Character Simplification Scheme (Draft) on 20 December 1977, rescinded in 1986.

Structure
The Chinese Character Simplification Scheme is divided into three parts. The first part consists of 230 simplified characters; the second part consists of 285 simplified characters; the third part consists of 54 simplified radicals. The first and second parts differ in their time of implementation; the first part was to be implemented the day after the announcement, while the second part was mostly implemented in three batches later between 1956 and 1959 after further trials and slight changes, leaving out 28 simplified characters which were implemented in 1964 when the List of Simplified Chinese Characters was published.

Controversy
The simplification of Chinese characters met strong resistance from the public and the academia. The prominent scholar Chen Mengjia was one of the outspoken critics of the scheme. When the Anti-Rightist Movement began in 1957, Chen was labeled a Rightist and attacked as an enemy of the Communist Party. In 1966, at the beginning of the Cultural Revolution, Chen was again severely persecuted for his ideas and committed suicide.

On 10 January 1958, Premier Zhou Enlai gave a report on the task of Chinese writing reform, in which he criticized "rightists" for opposing the scheme, saying that the opposition was used to undermine the party and state. He went on to state that simplification was "in line with the interests of the general public," and "should be strongly supported."

See also
Simplified Chinese characters
Second round of simplified Chinese characters

References

Chinese characters
1950s in China
Simplified Chinese characters